Serkan (also Romanized as Serkān and Serkān) is a city in the Central District of Tuyserkan County, Hamadan Province, Iran. At the 2006 census, its population was 4,557, in 1,418 families.

References

Populated places in Tuyserkan County

Cities in Hamadan Province